Baby Rock may refer to:

 , a 2005 mini-album by Japanese group Back-On
 "Baby Rock", a 2014 single by Gwendal Peizerat
 Baby Rock, a discotheque on Avenida Revolución in Tijuana, Mexico

See also
 Baby Rocks, Arizona, a populated place in Navajo County, Arizona, United States